Akemi Masuda (born January 1, 1964) is a retired Japanese female long-distance runner. She competed for Japan at the 1984 Summer Olympics in Los Angeles, California, although she failed to finish the race. Masuda set her personal best in the classic distance (2:30:30) in 1983.

She rose to prominence with a gold medal on the track over 3000 metres at the 1981 Asian Athletics Championships and by winning the inaugural 20 km women's race at the Sapporo Half Marathon event. She continued to focus on road events and  won at the 1982 Chiba Marathon and the 1983 Nike OTC Marathon. Her 2:30:30 at age 19 in that race was the World Junior Record.  She was the runner-up at the 1984 Osaka Ladies Marathon, a result which led to her the starting line of the first Olympic women's marathon. Among her other results, she was third at the 1989 Hokkaido Marathon and took 19th place at the 1990 London Marathon.

Achievements

References

 sports-reference

1964 births
Living people
Sportspeople from Chiba Prefecture
Japanese female long-distance runners
Japanese female marathon runners
Olympic female long-distance runners
Olympic athletes of Japan
Athletes (track and field) at the 1984 Summer Olympics
Japan Championships in Athletics winners
20th-century Japanese women
21st-century Japanese women